Malibu Shores is an American primetime teen drama/soap opera that aired on Saturday Night at 8:00PM EST from March to June 1996 for ten episodes on NBC. Created by Aaron Spelling and starring Keri Russell and Tony Lucca, the program followed the exploits of Southern California teens.

Plot
The show revolves around two different lifestyles that clashed repeatedly. On one side of the tracks was the wealthy Malibu crowd, and on the other was the more working-class gang of "the Valley". When Zack (Tony Lucca) from the Valley meets Chloe (Keri Russell) from the Malibu beachfront, they fall in love; but no one thinks it is a good idea but the two of them. After their "love-at-first-sight" meeting, Zach is transferred to Chloe's school along with his friends (due to an earthquake). The remainder of the episodes dealt with the clashing of the two groups.

Cancellation
Malibu Shores debuted as a midseason replacement and was initially picked up for six episodes (including a two-hour pilot episode). Scheduled on Saturdays at 8:00 p.m., the series drew low ratings and was canceled within one season.

Cast
Keri Russell as Chloe Walker
Tony Lucca as Zack Morrison
Christian Campbell as Teddy Delacourt
Katie Wright as Nina Gerard
Greg Vaughan as Josh Walker
Tia Texada as Kacey Martinez
Charisma Carpenter as Ashley Green
Jacob Vargas as Benny
Randy Spelling as Flipper Gage
Kristen Miller as Martha Lewis
Walter Jones as Michael "Mouse" Hammon
Susan Ward as Bree
Essence Atkins as Julie Tate
Ian Ogilvy as Marc Delacourt
Michelle Phillips as Suki Walker

Episodes

Awards and nominations

References

External links

1996 American television series debuts
1996 American television series endings
1990s American teen drama television series
American television soap operas
American primetime television soap operas
English-language television shows
NBC original programming
Television series about teenagers
Television series by CBS Studios
Television series by Spelling Television
Television shows set in Malibu, California